The 1968 Indiana gubernatorial election was held on November 5, 1968.

Incumbent Democratic Governor Roger D. Branigin was term-limited.

Republican nominee Edgar Whitcomb defeated Democratic nominee Robert L. Rock with 52.72% of the vote.

Nominations
Until 1976, all nominations for statewide office in Indiana were made by state conventions.

Democratic nomination

Candidates
Richard C. Bodine, former Speaker of the Indiana House of Representatives
Robert L. Rock, incumbent Lieutenant Governor

Results
The Democratic convention was held on June 21, 1968.

Republican primary

Candidates
Dr. Otis Bowen, Speaker of the Indiana House of Representatives
Earl Butz, former Assistant United States Secretary of Agriculture
Edgar Whitcomb, incumbent Secretary of State of Indiana

Results
The Republican convention was held on June 18, 1968.

General election

Governor

Candidates
Melvin E. Hawk, Prohibition
Robert L. Rock, Democratic
Edgar Whitcomb, Republican

Results

Lieutenant governor

References

Bibliography
 
 
 

1968
Indiana
Gubernatorial
November 1968 events in the United States